Biggy 237 (self-proclaimed "Big Brother Cameroon") is a Cameroonian reality competition created in 2020 by a patriotic Cameroonian with a love for show biz whose identity we got as Jazzy J. The show aimed at nurturing talents and inspiring hope in young Cameroonians and also aimed at bringing Anglophone Cameroonians and Francophone Cameroonians together.

The show is a pirated edition of Big Brother and it does not hold the license of Big Brother franchise. However, followers of the show and medias still using "Big Brother Cameroon" as the promotional name. And also, "Biggie" is the word that the housemates and productions call Big Brother in Big Brother Naija.

The show features 25 contestants live in the ‘Biggy's Mansion’ from 2 August 2020, competed to win FCFA10 million (equivalent to $18,102), a car, as well as other prizes including a trip to Dubai.

All contestants were tested for COVID-19 as well as HIV, Hepatitis, Chlamydia and other medical tests. They were also placed on quarantine since 18 July 2020.

While in the Biggy‘s mansion, the contestants are expected to express themselves in English (on Mondays and Saturdays), French (Tuesdays and Fridays), Pidgin (Wednesdays), Camfranglais (Thursdays), and English and French (Sundays).

The organizers have created a Biggy TV HD channel on BT Media Group to broadcast the show to the public. The show is also widely watched international via Facebook and YouTube and the viewers are expected to vote for their favourite contestants.

References

External links
Official website
Biggy 237 Channel on YouTube

Television in Cameroon
2020s reality television series
Entertainment events in Cameroon
Articles to be expanded from August 2020